Elina de Lourdes Urbano (born 21 February 1964), known as Ana Urbano, is an Argentine former rower. She competed in the women's single sculls event at the 1996 Summer Olympics. She also won medals in athletics and triathlon, which included national titles in the heptathlon in 1980 and 1984.

References

External links
 

1964 births
Living people
Sportspeople from Mendoza, Argentina
Argentine pentathletes
Argentine heptathletes
Argentine high jumpers
Argentine female rowers
Olympic rowers of Argentina
Rowers at the 1996 Summer Olympics
Pan American Games competitors for Argentina
Pan American Games medalists in rowing
Pan American Games gold medalists for Argentina
Rowers at the 1995 Pan American Games
Rowers at the 1999 Pan American Games
Medalists at the 1995 Pan American Games
Medalists at the 1999 Pan American Games
20th-century Argentine women